Papapolitis may refer to:
Nicholas Papapolitis
Savas Papapolitis